Michael Ryan is a comic book artist who has worked for Marvel Comics. In 2004, Marvel Comics signed a three-year contract with Ryan, whose first work was New X-Men: Academy X with Nunzio DeFilippis and Christina Weir. Marvel's editor-in-chief, Joe Quesada, later said, "We don't want him anywhere else but here!"

Ryan had a brief tenure on Marvel's award-winning series Runaways with the writer Joss Whedon. He and Sara Pichelli pencilled X-Men: Manifest Destiny #5 in 2008. He also briefly drew the Mystique mini-series, as well as the New Excalibur series with the writer Chris Claremont.

His latest work has been with Aspen Comics.

References

External links
Michael Ryan at Comicvine.com

American comics artists
Place of birth missing (living people)
Year of birth missing (living people)
Game artists
Living people